Given Singuluma (born 19 July 1986) is a Zambian former professional footballer who played as an attacking midfielder.

Club career
Singuluma was born in Rufunsa. He started his career at the Lusaka-based National Assembly and also had spells with Zanaco of Zambia and the South African side Bay United before moving to TP Mazembe in 2009.

He signed with Buildcon FC in December 2017.

International career
Singuluma debuted for the Zambia national team in 2006 and represented the country at the Africa Cup of Nations in 2010 and 2015.

On 18 January 2015, Singuluma scored Zambia's opening goal of the 2015 Africa Cup of Nations in a 1–1 draw with the Democratic Republic of Congo.

References

1986 births
Living people
People from Rufunsa District
Zambian footballers
Association football forwards
Zambia international footballers
2010 Africa Cup of Nations players
2015 Africa Cup of Nations players
National Assembly F.C. players
Bay United F.C. players
Zanaco F.C. players
TP Mazembe players
Buildcon F.C. players
Zambian expatriate footballers
Zambian expatriate sportspeople in the Democratic Republic of the Congo
Expatriate footballers in the Democratic Republic of the Congo
Zambia A' international footballers
2009 African Nations Championship players
Zambian expatriate sportspeople in South Africa
Expatriate soccer players in South Africa